The Water Nymph (also known as The Beach Flirt) is a 1912 American silent comedy "split reel" short film starring Mabel Normand and directed by Mack Sennett.  Normand performed her own diving stunts for the film, which was the first Keystone Studios comedy.

The film precedes, and may have been the direct inspiration for, the Sennett Bathing Beauties performers first featured in 1915.

Cast
 Mabel Normand as Diving Venus
 Mack Sennett as Mack
 Ford Sterling as Mack's Father
 Gus Pixley
 Fred Mace 	
 Edward Dillon	 
 Mary Maxwell as Nymph
 Mae Busch (unconfirmed)

Production notes
The Water Nymph was shot on location in Venice, Los Angeles.

References

External links

 
 The Water Nymph (1912) at archive.org

1912 films
1912 comedy films
Silent American comedy films
American silent short films
American black-and-white films
Films directed by Mack Sennett
Films shot in Los Angeles
Keystone Studios films
1912 short films
Articles containing video clips
American comedy short films
1910s American films